Abdel Fattah Jafri (born 25 February 1950) is a Moroccan former footballer. He competed in the men's tournament at the 1972 Summer Olympics.

References

External links
 
 

1950 births
Living people
Moroccan footballers
Morocco international footballers
Olympic footballers of Morocco
Footballers at the 1972 Summer Olympics
Place of birth missing (living people)
Association football midfielders
Union Sidi Kacem players